FWCC may refer to:

 Fiji Women's Crisis Centre
 Friends World Committee for Consultation
 Families with Children from China
 Fort Worth Convention Center